Tapada limeña (means "Liman [fem.] covered one") was the denomination used at the time of the Viceroyalty of Peru and the first years of the Republic to designate the women in Lima who covered their heads and faces with comfortable silk , revealing just one eye. Its use began in the 16th century and it spread until well into the 19th century, that is, its use lasted for three centuries and was not only limited to the "City of the Kings", but also to other important cities in the region. In Lima, the custom remained until well into the Republic, when it was relegated by French fashions.

Background
In 1583, the Archbishop of Lima Toribio de Mogrovejo pronounced an energetic rejection of the Lima custom of wearing the saya and the cloak as usual garments worn by women in the capital. This happened during the Third Liman Council that he himself presided over and that gave rise to a censorship that the Cortes of 1586 confirmed during the reign of Philip II of Spain. It was agreed that the offenders would be fined 3,000 maravedís. The fear of this custom, already widespread among Liman women and that had generated so many misunderstandings and confusion, made the authorities suspect that the first cases of transvestism in the Viceroyalty were taking place.

Origin
The use of the saya and the cloak, a pair of distinctive garments of the Tapada limeña, appeared in Lima around 1560. About its origin it has been said that it is Moorish, due to the undeniable similarities that they bear with the costumes that cover the body of Muslim women, although later the theory of its Castilian origin was established.

The first official testimonies that deal with clothing were not very merciful with their users:

There were many ordinances subsequent to this act of the Cortes of 1586, but none could dissuade the Liman women.

Characteristics

The characteristic attire of the tapada connoted insinuation, coquetry, prohibition and seduction game. However, it was still a dress: the saya outlined the hips and the cloak covered the head and face, except for course, a single eye. The tapada was a symbol of the freedom of Liman women and this symbol was used to distinguish themselves from women of other classes and roots (races). Behind the cloak could live a toothless grandmother as well as a one-eyed woman stung by smallpox. The possibilities were many, as there must have been many occasions when gallant boys or old men squandered compliments on their wives, sisters-in-law, mothers-in-law, mothers or daughters who could hide their true identity behind their cloaks.

The saya was a large and long silk skirt, colored blue, brown, green or black. To secure it, a belt was used that girded it to the woman's waist. It was not uncommon for some of the less graceful to wear false hips that exaggerated their natural endowments. Underneath this skirt it could see the small foot (shod with an embroidered satin shoe) that also made the colonial Lima women famous. The cloak was also made of silk, tied at the waist and up the back to cover the head and face, revealing only one eye and perhaps the arms. This cloak was usually a simple fabric so that the tapadas would not stand out in public and retain anonymity.

Political use of the saya

Over time, the varieties of costumes went hand in hand with the political climate, which the tapadas took advantage of to favor their caudillos. Felipe Santiago Salaverry with the saya salaverrina, Agustín Gamarra with the saya gamarrina, Luis José de Orbegoso with the saya orbegosina.

The Tapadas limeñas were an icon in ancient Lima, an original presence that did not exist in any other city in Hispanic America. The insinuating game, the symbol of secrecy, perhaps of an incipient female freedom, caught the attention of visitors who passed through the capital city during the three hundred years that the clothing was worn. In the 19th century they were painted by the Frenchman Leonce Angrand, the German Johann Moritz Rugendas and the Liman mulatto Pancho Fierro, as well as staged by Manuel Ascencio Segura in his satirical work La saya y el manto.

For her part, in Peregrinaciones de una paria (1838), Flora Tristan wrote about the saya:

Decline
Contrary to the opinion of some specialists, the Tapada limeña was not a fashion because the resistance to change and the attachment to tradition denote a stability, a comfort that allowed gossip, intrigues and other Lima customs. However, after three hundred years of validity, the tapada was disappearing and by 1860, the French fashion had displaced the saya and the mantle.

Gallery

References

Bibliography 
Jorge Basadre Grohmann, "Historia de la República del Perú", Lima, 2005.

Lima
Peruvian clothing
Colonial Peru
History of clothing (Western fashion)
Peruvian culture
Women in Peru